BidaMan: The Big Break is the week-long grand finals that was aired as a segment of the noontime show It's Showtime held on August 5–10, 2019.

Daily Batches (August 5 to 9, 2019) 
The top 2 finalists will advanced to the finale, while the other finalists will be eliminated.

Judges 
Bobet Vidanes
Edu Manzano
Rowell Santiago
John Arcilla
Jake Cuenca
Joseph Marco

Legend:

Batch 1 (August 5, 2019) 
Episode Hashtag: #ShowtimeBidaMan

Reenactment: FPJ's Ang Probinsyano

Batch 2 (August 6, 2019) 
Episode Hashtag: #ShowtimeBidaNgBayan

Reenactment: Home Sweetie Home

Batch 3 (August 7, 2019) 
Episode Hashtag: #ShowtimeSuperBida

Reenactment: Los Bastardos

Batch 4 (August 8, 2019) 
Episode Hashtag: #ShowtimeBidaLove

Reenactment: The General's Daughter

Batch 5 (August 9, 2019) 
Episode Hashtag: #ShowtimeBidangBida

Reenactment: Sino ang Maysala?: Mea Culpa

Head Hurado's Choice and Public Voting (August 9–10, 2019)

BidaMan: The Big Break Finale (August 10, 2019) 
BidaMan: The Big Break Finale was held on Saturday at New Frontier Theater, Quezon City. There are three rounds, Bida Moves, Matinee Matibay, and The Spotlight. The winner as the Ultimate BidaMan will take home Talent Management & Film Contract from ABS-CBN, brand new house and lot, brand new pick-up truck, and ₱1 million.

Episode Hashtag: #BidamanTheBigBreak

Judges 
Bobet Vidanes
Edu Manzano
Ruel S. Bayani
Angel Locsin
Ian Veneracion
Nadine Lustre
Joshua Garcia

Special Awards

Results 
Color Key:

Jin Macapagal, 24 years old, from Cebu City, emerged as the first Ultimate BidaMan.

Elimination chart

References 

It's Showtime (TV program)